Joaquín Badajoz is a Cuban-American writer, editor and journalist.

Boards 
Badajoz is a member of the North American Academy of the Spanish Language (ANLE), the editorial board Glosas (ANLE), RANLE (ANLE) and OtroLunes. He has been a member of the boards of Cuadernos de ALDEEU (Spanish Professionals in America), Vitral —recipient of prestigious Prince Claus Award 1999— among others.

Authorship 
He is one of the authors of the "Encyclopedia of Spanish in the United States", "Hablando (bien) se entiende la gente /Speaking Well Makes the World Go 'Round" (Spanish Edition), Aguilar; 1 edition (February 8, 2010); "Diccionario de Americanismos /Dictionary of Standardized Latin American Vocabulary" (Spanish Edition), Alfaguara (Asociación de Academias de la Lengua Española) 1st edition (April 17, 2010); "The School of Night. Drawings by Arturo Rodriguez" (New York. Island Project, 2014). He is the author of "Passar Páxaros/ Casa Obscura, aldea sumergida" (ANLE/Hypermedia, 2014).

Other Work 
Badajoz has worked as Managing Editor for the Spanish versions of Men's Health and Prevention, as well as Executive Editor of 'Cosmopolitan en español', under a partnership with Editorial Televisa. He was Front Page Editor of Yahoo until 2015. As of May 2015, he is Digital Manager of La Opinion. He is a columnist art critic for The Miami Herald and founder and owner of SpicandProud and Hypermedia Americas.

Personal life 
Badajoz is originally from Miami, but is now based in New York City. He resides in Alphabet City, Manhattan.

Articles 
 The Trojan Horse: Displacement and Resilience of the Uprooted Nation: ArtPulse Magazine. 
 The Kid in a Candy Store: The Storyteller’s Crossroads: Robert Zuckerman Exhibition Review: ArtPulse Magazine.
 Arnaldo Simón and the disturbing images of Artvertising: ArtPulse Magazine.
 Vincench vs. Vincench: A Dissident Dialogue from Cuba: ArtPulse Magazine.
 “Beware of Strangers of the Persuasive Kind”. Tania Marmolejo Review: Irreversible Magazine.
 Veritas Feminae: a visual encyclical about the immanent feminine: Alec Von Bargen Review: Irreversible Magazine. 
 The melody of the devil is a candid whisper. On Eduardo Sarmiento's Burning in his own hell. Exhibition catalogue, and curator, along with Carlos Luna.
 Wonderland: The Many Images of Misrepresentation. Rafael Lopez-Ramos Exhibition Review: Artdistricts Magazine.

Books 
 Passar Páxaros/ Casa Obscura, aldea sumergida (Poetry/ Spanish): Academia Norteamericana de la Lengua Española/ Hypermedia, Colección Pulso Herido, 2014.

Translations 
 Cruzar el límite Vol. 1, by Alegria, Malin, Pueblo Fronterizo Series. Originally published in English as "Border town: crossing the line". New York, NY, Scholastic, 2012. 184 p. Translated by Joaquín Badajoz. 2013 International Latino Book Award. Best Youth Latino Focused Chapter Book. SECOND PLACE 
 La lista de tontos, by Kowitt, Holly. Translated by Joaquín Badajoz. Originally published in English as "The Loser List". New York, NY, Scholastic, 2012. 
 Guerra de quinceañeras Vol. 2, by Alegria, Malin. Pueblo Fronterizo Series. Originally published in English as "Border town: Quince clash". Translated by Joaquín Badajoz. New York, NY. Scholastic Inc., 2013.
 Ser María: Amor y Caos en el Bronx, by Manzano, Sonia. Originally published in English as "Becoming Maria: Love and Chaos in the South Bronx". Translated by Joaquín Badajoz. New York, NY. Scholastic Inc., 2016.

References

External links 
 Academic Profile at Academia.
 Círculo de Poesía (magazine). 
 Fundación del Español Urgente. Ortografía Razonada: historia de un 'ortograficidio'
 En la despensa y otros poemas. Revista Conexos (magazine).
 Entrevista a Joaquín Badajoz. Instituto Castellano y Leonés de la Lengua. MiCastellano.tv (interview)
 Joaquín Badajoz: "No todo lo que uno escribe es literatura", Interview by Glenda Galán. MediaIsla. 
 Interview by Glenda Galán. Dominicana en Miami (blog). 
 Interview by Aymara Aymerich. Gaspar El Lugareño (blog).
 Cabrera, Yoandy. Apuntes sobre unos versos de Joaquín Badajoz. El jardín de Academos (Cuaderno de Crítica y Poesía), 09/08/2013.  
 Fernández Fe, Gerardo. Badajoz, en trineo, hacia la casa del poeta. Artes y Letras. El Nuevo Herald, 11/08/2014. 
 Tamargo, Jorge. Los pájaros de Joaquín Badajoz. Encomio de la Imagen (blog), 10/22/2014.
 Poetas Siglo XXI. Antología poética. Editor: Fernando Sabido.

Living people
1972 births
Cuban male writers
American writers of Cuban descent
Cuban emigrants to the United States
American male journalists
American male poets
21st-century American poets
21st-century American male writers